Ashram is a Hindu hermitage or retreat, typically for spiritual instruction and meditation.

Ashram may also refer to:

Linoy Ashram (born 1999), Israeli individual rhythmic gymnast
Ashram (Balmiki), the main site of worship in the Balmiki faith
Ashram (band), an Italian band
The Ashram, a 2005 novel by Sattar Memon
Ashram, or Ashrama, one of four age-based life stages in Hinduism
The Ashram, a 2018 Indian-American film by Ben Rekhi
Aashram, an 2020 Hindi-language crime drama web series directed by Prakash Jha for MX Player original

See also
Ashrama (disambiguation)